German South West Africa was a colony of the German Empire from 1884 until 1915, though Germany did not officially recognise its loss of this territory until the 1919 Treaty of Versailles. With a total area of 835,100 km², it was one and a half times the size of the mainland German Empire in Europe at the time. The colony had a population of around 2,600 Germans.

German rule over this territory was punctuated by numerous rebellions by its native African peoples, which culminated in a campaign of German reprisals from 1904 to 1908 known as the Herero and Namaqua genocide.

In 1915, during World War I, German South West Africa was invaded by the Western Allies in the form of South African and British forces. After the war its administration was taken over by the Union of South Africa (part of the British Empire) and the territory was administered as South West Africa under a League of Nations mandate. It became independent as Namibia on 21 March 1990.

Early settlements
Initial European contact with the areas which would become German South West Africa came from traders and sailors, starting in January 1486 when Portuguese explorer Diogo Cão, possibly accompanied by Martin Behaim, landed at Cape Cross. However, for several centuries, European settlement would remain limited and temporary. In February 1805, the London Missionary Society established a small mission in Blydeverwacht, but the efforts of this group met with little success. In 1840, the London Missionary Society transferred all of its activities to the German Rhenish Missionary Society. Some of the first representatives of this organisation were Franz Heinrich Kleinschmidt (who arrived in October 1842) and Carl Hugo Hahn (who arrived in December 1842). They began founding churches throughout the territory. The Rhenish missionaries had a significant impact initially on culture and dress, and then later on politics. During the same time that the Rhenish missionaries were active, merchants and farmers were establishing outposts.

Early history
On 16 November 1882, a German merchant from Bremen, Adolf Lüderitz, requested protection for a station that he planned to build in South West Africa, from Chancellor Bismarck. Once this was granted, his employee, Heinrich Vogelsang, purchased land from a native chief and established a settlement at Angra Pequena which was renamed Lüderitz. On 24 April 1884, he placed the area under the protection of Imperial Germany to deter possible encroachment by other European powers. In early 1884, the gunboat  visited to review the situation. The German flag was finally raised in South West Africa on 7 August 1884. The German claims on this land were confirmed during the Conference of Berlin.

In April 1885, the Deutsche Kolonialgesellschaft für Südwest-Afrika (German Colonial Society for Southwest Africa, known as DKGSWA) was founded with the support of German bankers (Gerson von Bleichröder, Adolph von Hansemann), industrialists (Count Guido Henckel von Donnersmarck) and politicians (Frankfurt mayor Johannes von Miquel). DKGSWA was granted monopoly rights to exploit mineral deposits, following Bismarck's policy that private rather than public money should be used to develop the colonies. The new Society soon bought the assets of Lüderitz's failing enterprises, land and mineral rights. Lüderitz drowned the next year while on an expedition to the mouth of the Orange River. Later, in 1908, diamonds were discovered. Thus along with gold, copper, platinum, and other minerals, diamonds became a major investment.

In May, Heinrich Ernst Göring was appointed Commissioner and established his administration at Otjimbingwe. Then, on 17 April 1886, a law creating the legal system of the colony was passed, creating a dual system with laws for Europeans and different laws for natives.

Over the following years, relations between the German settlers and the indigenous peoples continued to worsen.  Additionally, the British settlement at Walvis Bay, a coastal enclave within South West Africa, continued to develop, and many small farmers and missionaries moved into the region.  A complex web of treaties, agreements, and vendettas increased the unrest.  In 1888 the first group of Schutztruppen—colonial protectorate troops—arrived, sent to protect the military base at Otjimbingwe.

In 1890, the colony was declared a German Crown Colony, and more troops were sent. In July of the same year, as part of the Heligoland–Zanzibar Treaty between Britain and Germany, the colony grew in size through the acquisition of the Caprivi Strip in the northeast, promising new trade routes into the interior.

Almost simultaneously, between August and September 1892, the South West Africa Company Ltd (SWAC) was established by the German, British, and Cape Colony governments, aided by financiers to raise the capital required to enlarge mineral exploitation (specifically, the Damaraland concession's copper deposit interests).

A veterinary cordon fence was introduced in 1896 to control rinderpest by restricting population and livestock movement.  Later known as the Red Line, it became a political boundary with police protection concentrated south of the line, while northern areas were controlled though indirect colonial rule using traditional authorities. This led to different political and economic outcomes for example between the northern Ovambo people compared to the more centrally located Herero people.      

German South West Africa was the only German colony in which Germans settled in large numbers. German settlers were drawn to the colony by economic possibilities in diamond and copper mining, and especially farming. In 1902 the colony had 200,000 inhabitants, although only 2,595 were recorded as German, while 1,354 were Afrikaners and 452 were British. By 1914, 9,000 more German settlers had arrived. There were probably around 80,000 Herero, 60,000 Ovambo, and 10,000 Nama, who were referred to as Hottentots.

Rebellion against German rule and genocide of the Herero and Namaqua

Through 1893 and 1894, the first "Hottentot Uprising" of the Nama and their leader Hendrik Witbooi occurred. The following years saw many further local uprisings against German rule. Before the Herero and Namaqua genocide of 1904–1907, the Herero and Nama had good reasons to distrust the Germans, culminating in the Khaua-Mbandjeru rebellion. This rebellion, in which the Germans tried to control the Khaua by seizing their property under cover of European legal views of property ownership (criticised at home for being no real reform of the notion of collective tribal ownership). This led to the largest of the rebellions, known as the Herero Wars (or Herero genocide) of 1904.

Remote farms were attacked, and approximately 150 German settlers were killed. The Schutztruppe of only 766 troops and native auxiliary forces was, at first, no match for the Herero. The Herero went on the offensive, sometimes surrounding Okahandja and Windhoek, and destroying the railway bridge to Osona. Additional 14,000 troops, hastened from Germany under Lieutenant General Lothar von Trotha, crushed the rebellion in the Battle of Waterberg.

Earlier von Trotha issued an ultimatum to the Herero people, denying them the right of being German subjects and ordering them to leave the country or be killed. To escape, the Herero retreated into the waterless Omaheke region, a western arm of the Kalahari Desert, where many of them died of thirst. The German forces guarded every water source and were given orders to shoot any adult male Herero on sight. Only a few Herero managed to escape into neighbouring British Bechuanaland.

The German official military report on the campaign lauded the tactics:

In late 1904, the Nama entered the struggles against the colonial power under their leaders Hendrik Witbooi and Jakobus Morenga, the latter often referred to as "the black Napoleon", despite losing most of his battles. This uprising was finally quashed during 1907–1908. In total, between 25,000 and 100,000 Herero, more than 10,000 Nama and 1,749 Germans died in the conflict.

After the official end of the conflict, the remaining natives, when finally released from detention, were subject to a policy of dispossession, deportation, forced labour, and racial segregation and discrimination in a system that in many ways anticipated apartheid. The genocide remains relevant to ethnic identity in independent Namibia and to relations with Germany.

The neighbouring British objected to what they regarded as the inhumane German policy. This involved maintaining a number of concentration camps in the colony during their war against the Herero and Nama peoples. Besides these camps, the indigenous people were interned in other places. These included private businesses and government projects, ships offshore, Etappenkommando in charge of supplies of prisoners to companies, private persons, etc., as well as any other materials. Concentration camps implies poor sanitation and a population density that would imply disease. Prisoners were used as slave labourers in mines and railways, for use by the military or settlers.

The Herero and Namaqua genocide has been recognised by the United Nations and by the Federal Republic of Germany. On the 100th anniversary of the camp's foundation, German Minister for Economic Development and Cooperation Heidemarie Wieczorek-Zeul commemorated the dead on-site and apologised for the camp on behalf of Germany. In May 2021, after five years of negotiations, the German government - recognising  the Hottentot Rebellion as a colonial genocide - set up a $1.3 billion compensation fund.

Gallery

First World War

The news about the start of World War I reached German South West Africa on 2 August 1914 via radio telegraphy. The information was transmitted from the Nauen transmitter station via a relay station in Kamina and Lomé in Togo to the radio station in Windhoek.

During the First World War, South African troops opened hostilities with an assault on the Ramansdrift police station on 13 September 1914. German settlers were transported to concentration camps near Pretoria and later in Pietermaritzburg. Because of the overwhelming numerical superiority of the South African troops, the German Schutztruppe, along with groups of Afrikaner volunteers fighting in the Maritz rebellion on the German side, offered opposition only as a delaying tactic. On 9 July 1915, Victor Franke, the last commander of the Schutztruppe, capitulated near Khorab.

Two members of the Schutztruppe, geography professors Fritz Jaeger and Leo Waibel, are remembered for their explorations of the northern part of German South West Africa, which became the book Contributions to the Geography of South West Africa (Beiträge zur Landeskunde von Südwestafrika).

Postwar

After the war, the territory came under the control of Britain and then was made a South African League of Nations mandate. The territory eventually became subject to apartheid under South African rule, as well as becoming involved in the Angolan civil war in 1975. In 1990, the former colony became independent as Namibia, governed by the former liberation movement SWAPO.

German legacy
Many German names, buildings, and businesses still exist in the country, and about 30,000 people of German descent still live there. German is still widely used in Namibia, with the Namibian Broadcasting Corporation operating a German-language radio station and broadcasting television news bulletins in German, while the daily newspaper Allgemeine Zeitung, founded in 1916, remains in publication. Deukom, a satellite television service, offers television and radio channels from Germany.

In addition, Lutheranism is the predominant Christian denomination in present-day Namibia.

German placenames

Most place names in German South West Africa continued to bear German spellings of the local names, as well as German translations of some local phrases.
The few exceptions to the rule included places founded by the Rhenish Missionary Society, generally biblical names, as well as:
Hoornkrans
Sandfontein
Stolzenfels
Waterberg (Otjiwarongo)

Planned symbols for German South West Africa 

In 1914 a series of drafts were made for proposed Coat of Arms and Flags for the German Colonies. However, World War I broke out before the designs were finished and implemented and the symbols were never actually taken into use. Following the defeat in the war, Germany lost all its colonies and the prepared coat of arms and flags were therefore never used.

See also

List of colonial governors of South West Africa
List of former German colonies
Postage stamps and postal history of German South West Africa
Germans of Namibia
German Kamerun
Togoland
German East Africa
German African Party

References
Notes

Bibliography

 Table of Contents

 Table of Contents

Further reading
Aydelotte, William Osgood. "The First German Colony and Its Diplomatic Consequences." Cambridge Historical Journal 5#3 (1937): 291-313. Online 
 Bullock, A.L.C. Germany's Colonial Demands, Oxford University Press, 1939.
 
Hull, Isabel. Absolute Destruction: Military Culture and the Practices of War in Imperial Germany. Ithaca, NY: Cornell University Press, 2006. Preview
Hillebrecht, Werner. "'Certain uncertainties', or venturing progressively into colonial apologetics?" Journal of Namibian Studies, 1. 2007. pp. 73–95. Accessed 6 September 2020. Online
Historicus Africanus: "Der 1. Weltkrieg in Deutsch-Südwestafrika 1914/15", Band 1, 2. Auflage, Windhoek 2012, 
Historicus Africanus: "Der 1. Weltkrieg in Deutsch-Südwestafrika 1914/15", Band 2, "Naulila", Windhoek 2012, 
Historicus Africanus: "Der 1. Weltkrieg in Deutsch-Südwestafrika 1914/15", Band 3, "Kämpfe im Süden", Windhoek 2014, 
Historicus Africanus: "Der 1. Weltkrieg in Deutsch-Südwestafrika 1914/15", Band 4, "Der Süden ist verloren", Windhoek 2016, 
Historicus Africanus: "Der 1. Weltkrieg in Deutsch-Südwestafrika 1914/15", Band 5, "Aufgabe der Küste", Windhoek 2016, 
Historicus Africanus: "Der 1. Weltkrieg in Deutsch-Südwestafrika 1914/15", Band 6, "Aufgabe der Zentralregionen", Windhoek 2017, 
Historicus Africanus: "Der 1. Weltkrieg in Deutsch-Südwestafrika 1914/15", Band 7, "Der Ring schließt sich", Windhoek 2018, 
Historicus Africanus: "Der 1. Weltkrieg in Deutsch-Südwestafrika 1914/15", Band 8, "Das Ende bei Khorab", Windhoek 2018, 
Krömer/Krömer: "Fotografische Erinnerungen an Deutsch-Südwestafrika", Band 1, Fotos und Ansichtskarten aus Kriegs- und Friedenstagen, Windhoek 2012, 
Krömer/Krömer: "Fotografische Erinnerungen an Deutsch-Südwestafrika", Band 2, Orte, Menschen und Geschichte in alten Fotografien, Windhoek 2013, 
Krömer/Krömer: "Fotografische Erinnerungen an Deutsch-Südwestafrika", Band 3, Der 1. Weltkrieg in Deutsch-Südwestafrika, Windhoek 2018, 
Reith, Wolfgang: "Die Oberhäuptlinge des Hererovolkes", Von den Anfängen bis zum ungelösten Streit der Gegenwart, Windhoek 2017, 
Reith, Wolfgang: "Die Kaiserlichen Schutztruppen", Deutschlands Kolonialarmee 1889-1919, Windhoek 2017,

External links

 Klaus Dierks' chronology of Namibia
 worldstatesmen.org (Namibia)
 The New Student's Reference Work/German Southwest Africa
 Debie LeBeau's Development work on Namibia
 "Contributions to the Geography of South West Africa" from 1920–21 via the World Digital Library

 
History of Namibia
South West Africa
Former protectorates
German colonisation in Africa
Germany–Namibia relations
Former colonies in Africa
1884 establishments in German South West Africa
1915 disestablishments in South West Africa